is a former Japanese football player.

Club statistics

References

External links

library.footballjapan.jp

1986 births
Living people
Association football people from Tochigi Prefecture
Japanese footballers
J1 League players
Japan Football League players
Kashima Antlers players
Kamatamare Sanuki players
Association football defenders